Servio Severino (born 2 January 1966) is a Dominican Republic wrestler. He competed in two events at the 1984 Summer Olympics.

References

Living people
Dominican Republic male sport wrestlers
Olympic wrestlers of the Dominican Republic
Wrestlers at the 1984 Summer Olympics
Place of birth missing (living people)
1966 births